Daniel Köllerer won this tournament, after defeating Filippo Volandri 6–3, 7–5.

Seeds

Draw

Final four

Top half

Bottom half

References
 Main Draw
 Qualifying Draw

Trani Cup - Singles
Trani Cup